Superhuman Samurai Syber-Squad (or, in short, SSSS) is an American television series. It was produced by Tsuburaya Productions, Ultracom Inc. and DIC Productions, L.P., with distribution by All American Television, and ran for a duration of 53 episodes from September 12, 1994 to April 11, 1995 in syndication, as well as on ABC. It was an adaptation of the Japanese tokusatsu series Gridman the Hyper Agent.

Plot

High school student Sam Collins, the head of a band known as Team Samurai, is zapped during a recording session by a power surge and disappears, only to return seconds later with a strange device attached to his wrist which, at the time, is unremovable. Later after his friends, Amp, Sydney, and Tanker, leave, one of his video game programs, dubbed Servo, is subject to a power surge and zaps Sam again just after he has remarked "Cool battle armor!" - this time he is pulled into the digital world and transformed into his creation. As Servo, he roams the digital world and fights monsters dubbed Mega-Viruses which are capable of attacking any device on the electrical grid (including the grid itself), Internet or telephone network, usually having real-life consequences far beyond what any standard computer virus would be capable of achieving.

Meanwhile, Malcolm Frink, another student from Sam's school, is designing monsters on his home computer when Kilokahn, an escaped military artificial-intelligence program that was presumed destroyed in the power surge, visits him via his computer screen and strikes a Faustian deal with him, transforming his digital monster into a Mega-Virus.

Sam, now as Servo, must enter the digital world and stop Malcolm's and Kilokahn's Mega-Viruses. Sometimes, when Servo is unable to handle a virus by himself, he would enlist the help of his friends using his Arsenal Programs which could fight the viruses solo, transform, with the help of other Programs, and attach to Servo as armor. Since Team Samurai consists of only three people at any one time following Sam's disappearance, only three vehicles are available for use at any one time. When Servo combines with these Programs as armor, he changes his name to either Phormo once combined with Drago or Synchro once combined with Zenon.

Characters

Team Samurai

 Sam Collins / Servo (portrayed by Matthew Lawrence) - the frontman and guitarist of his band, Team Samurai. He is always willing to help anyone in need or be their friend and often vies for the attention of cheerleader Jennifer Doyle, having been in and out of relationships with her, sometimes even competing with Malcolm Frink for her affections. He even goes so far as to try to be friends with Malcolm, although Malcolm never returns the favor. He is clever and easygoing. He also loves his (unseen) little sister, Elizabeth, though often feels pestered by her shenanigans.
 Tanker (portrayed by Kevin Castro) - Sam's best friend, the band's drummer, and a somewhat stereotypical athlete. He is particularly adept at school sports, especially football. He has a crush on fellow Team Samurai member Sydney, especially admiring her for her intelligence. He always seems to have a large appetite, and as evidenced in the episode "A Break in the Food Chain", he goes crazy if he eats nothing for a duration. He also holds a particularly strong dislike for Malcolm Frink. In Syberspace, Tanker's uniform was a black biker suit with a black helmet and a see-through visor.
 Sydney "Syd" Forrester (portrayed by Robin Mary Florence) - the band's keyboard player and the brains of the group. She is also a good singer, as shown in "His Master's Voice". She is one of North Valley High's brightest students, and often displayed a caring personality. She is the object of Tanker's affection, and the two enjoy being together. Sydney's Syberspace uniform was a pink biker suit with a gold helmet and a see-through visor.
 Amp Ere (portrayed by Troy Slaten) - the team's so-called "space cadet" and the band's bass player. He becomes the band's bass player after revealing to them that his brother (who was originally intended to join them instead of Amp) was going back to college. His intelligence is curious, as he either is clueless to his surroundings or displays some unusual intellect. He has an unorthodox way of performing tasks, such as writing in a notebook using his toes or studying by eating book pages with milk and sugar. To enter Syberspace, he always uses a different phrase to be humorous. Amp's uniform consisted of a helicopter helmet and leather jacket. It is later revealed that Amp is really an alien and returns to his own planet with his parents off-screen.
 Lucky London (portrayed by Rembrandt Sabelis) - a surfer and Amp's replacement in Team Samurai. His attitude was often laid-back, sometimes to the dismay of Principal Pratchert. In Syberspace, Lucky's uniform is a red and white jet ski helmet with a black visor and life jacket.

Supporting characters
 Jennifer "Jen" Doyle (portrayed by Jayme Betcher) - Sam's on-again/off-again girlfriend and a cheerleader at North Valley High School. Malcolm tries to compete for her affections. In the alternate version, Jen is a genius who liked Malcolm befriended and helps Sam get back to his normal universe.
 Principal Pratchert (portrayed by John Wesley) - the school principal who is usually strict, particularly when dealing with antics caused by either Sam and/or Malcolm. When his daughter loses the student council presidency to Malcolm in "The President's a Frink", he initially refuses to recount the votes when Malcolm comments it would make the Education Board suspect he was playing favorites and could do so only when he agreed that Malcolm could use his parking space should he remain victor. Pratchert would reconsider recounting the votes when Mrs. Starkey wisely suggests he does so for not only the sake of his job but also his daughter Yolanda. He does and it is revealed Malcolm rigged the votes using Skorn so he can win, so Pratchert punishes him by making him move his car out of his parking space for an undisclosed time in detention. In "Pratchert's Radical Departure", it is revealed that Pratchert used to be a hippie when he was younger - Malcolm uses this to his advantage by creating a Mega-Virus monster that makes him think he was a hippie again, much to the delight of Lucky London (at least until the Mega-Virus's destruction by Servo).
 Mrs. Rimba "Cha-Cha" Starkey (portrayed by Diana Bellamy) - the cafeteria lunch lady who often cracks jokes relating to the poor quality of the food she serves, such as enjoying her hobby of riding her motorcycle and being married multiple times. She also seems to have an affinity for Dennis Quaid, as mentioned in a few episodes. She is the only faculty member in North Valley High School who doesn't like Malcolm. When Pratchert was depressed over Yolanda refusing to talk to him, Starkey wisely suggests he does the right thing and recount the votes and admits her suspicion that the voting was rigged. After the recount and although Mrs. Starkey pretends to forget suggesting it, she is touched that Pratchert does value her opinion.
 Yolanda "Yoli" Pratchert (portrayed by Kelli Kirkland) - the principal's daughter and Jennifer's closest friend. She's North Valley High School's student council president, a position she temporarily loses in "The President's a Frink" when Malcolm cheats his way into office (with the help of a virus) but she regains it when Principal Pratchert recounts the votes after Servo defeats the virus sent to change the results. In "What Rad Universe!", an alternate dimension version of Yolanda finds companionship in Kilokahn making her that dimension's version of Malcolm while the Malcolm of that dimension is a good person much like the real Yoli and Sam.
 Elizabeth "Liz" Collins (voiced by Kath Soucie) - Sam's "unseen" younger sister who communicates with her brother off-screen through a laundry chute connected from the upstairs. She always plays pranks on her older brother, usually dropping things on top of him through the chute. Liz has shown she does care for Sam and drops a ton of cookies to share with him.

Villains
 Kilokahn (voiced by Tim Curry) - short for "Kilometric Knowledge-base Animate Human Nullity", Kilokahn is a military artificial intelligence program who unleashes computer viruses to attack major computer systems. He derisively refers to humans as "meat-things". He considers himself the ruler of the digital world and also wishes to take over the real world (Earth) starting with its computer network.
 Malcolm Frink (played by Glen Beaudin) - a loner who dresses in black garb and also attends North Valley High School. He only finds companionship in Kilokahn. Using a special program, he designs the Mega-Viruses which are brought to life by Kilokahn and sent into a specific electronic object. Most of the Mega-Viruses are either designed on his computer or have their drawings image-scanned into his computer so that Kilokhan brings them to life. Sam sees that Malcolm is alone and tries to strike up a friendship with him, but Malcolm rejects his offers stating that he likes being alone. The only exceptions to that rule are in "His Master's Voice" when Malcolm was touched by Sydney's apology and in "Kilo is Coming to Town" when he finally realizes that his selfish nature nearly cost Sam his life. Malcolm has a very strong dislike of Tanker and is intimidated by Mrs. Starkey. He derives enjoyment out of hurting others with his computer viruses which he creates and Kilokahn brings to life. In spite of Kilokahn's regular betrayal of him and lacking any other 'friends', Malcolm always comes back to him. He even purposely restores Kilokahn to his sociopathic self after he is temporarily rendered harmless. In the alternate universe version, Malcolm is a generous and caring person who likes to help people, unlike the alternate Yoli who takes pleasure from harming others.

Mega-Virus Monsters
The Mega-Virus Monsters are Kaiju-style computer viruses produced by Malcolm and given sentience by Kilokhan. Malcolm creates the Mega-Viruses since Kilokhan lacks the ability. Only a few Mega-Viruses have the power of speech.

 Kathod - the very first virus that Servo ever fought after Malcolm first met Kilokhan. Kathod was a long-tailed turtle-style creature who mostly crawled on four legs (though once during the battle, he was up on two) and had two volcano holes built into its shell, from which he could erupt powerful fireballs. He could also breathe fireballs at will. Kathod was brought to life by Kilokhan in "To Protect and Servo" to tamper with phone communications on Malcolm's request so that Sam would not call Jennifer. Around the same time, a freak accident with Sam's computer turns him into Servo for the first time and is transported to where Kathod is causing havoc. After a fierce battle, Kathod was destroyed by Servo's Grid Power Punch. In "Just Brown and Servo", Kathod went into every car engine to tamper with it until it was destroyed by Servo.
 Blink is an armored cycloptic virus with skilled fighting techniques. He was sent into the police files in "Samurize" in order to create false arrests including one on Jennifer during her date with Sam as the police were looking for Sam. He wielded dual metal combat sticks with pointy ends. When he proved to be too much for Servo, Tanker boarded Drago and went into the system to aid Servo. By combining him with Drago, they became Servo's upgrade known as Phormo. During this part of the battle, Blink took his two sticks and merged them into one long, double-edged combat stick. It would do him no good in the end though, because he ended up getting taken out of the picture by Phormo, who used a special Grid Power Fire Stream that erupted from the gem on Phormo's chest.
 Trembulor - a large black spike-covered virus who, hence his name, could shake wildly, causing tremors in Syberspace. He was sent into the government's defense satellites in "Samurize, Guys!" to create an electrical barrier around Sam's house, trapping Sam and the rest of Team Samurai inside when they were to appear for a band performance at North Valley High School that night. As Servo, Sam went in to battle the virus. This monster demonstrated the ability to suck up Servo's main power right through the gem on Servo's chest. Servo lost 80% of his power after this move, so Sydney tried to program some help for him. She, Tanker and Amp were thrust into their vehicles (Borr, Tracto, and Vitor, respectively) for the very first time. They used their vehicles to aid Servo in battle, and soon merged with him to create the Synchro program. Synchro's formation turned the battle back in Team Samurai's favor, and he proceeded to destroy the virus by launching his Shoulder Drill Missiles directly at him. Servo faced him twice later on in the series, and both times he used the Synchro program to win the battles. In "Foreign Languages", Trembulor is upgraded with armor where he is sent to make sure that nobody will understand Servo when he calls for help.
 Thorned Virus - a pinkish-colored plant/dinosauric monster with leaf veins patterned throughout its body. It shot white powder from its mouth. Servo and Tanker in Drago battled with it in "Out of Sight, Out of Time". In "My Virus Ate My Homework", it was formerly introduced where Kilokhan wanted to send it into the nuclear missiles. When Malcolm was against this plot, Kilokhan brought it to life before Malcolm could delete it. Servo entered the internet through Sydney's laptop. As Tanker controlled Drago, he helped Servo fight the Thorned Virus. Servo was able to destroy the Thorned Virus and the missile was averted.
 Krono - a diamond-backed dinosauric Mega-Virus monster. Krono can shoot a blue beam from its mouth. In its first appearance in "Out of Sight, Out of Time", Malcolm created Krono and had Kilokhan send it into an atomic clock in England to render time in the world meaningless. Upon learning this, Sam became Servo to fight Krono. Sydney joined the battle in Vitor and was hit by Krono's attack. Tanker and Amp joined the battle and helped to form Synchro. He was destroyed by Synchro's Grid Power Punch. In "To Sleep Perchance To Scream", he was sent into the tracking satellite that the Navy sent up. Servo (as Synchro) destroyed him again, but it turned out that it was only the first in a series of nightmares Sam would have throughout the episode. In "Syber-Dunk", Krono creates a barrier that prevents Team Samurai and basketball star Charles "High Jump" Johnson from leaving the school when the latter had a basketball game to play in that night. With the unlikely help of High Jump (who was forced to board Borr), Synchro destroyed Krono again with his Grid Power.
 Plexton is a dinosauric fire virus. He appeared several different times. He first appeared in "Some Like it Scalding" where Kilokhan sent him into the school's thermostat to make the temperature scorching hot. Servo fought him in a hot battle until Sydney creates the Samurai Sword and a shield for Servo to use. After Servo beheads and betails Plexton, Malcolm prepared a backup disk so Kilokhan can withdraw Plexton from battle. He later appeared in "The Cold Shoulder" alongside his sister Gramm and battled Servo. Servo tricked the two monsters into attacking each other causing them to turn against each other and it seemed that Plexton had the upper hand in their sibling rivalry. They were taken down by Servo's sword (which was powered up by his Grid Power) while the two monsters were distracted. In "Rock 'n' Roll Virucide", Servo fought Plexton and Gramm again. Servo defeats them with the same tactic. He then appeared with an armor upgrade and went inside Sam's blow dryer in the episode "Hair I Stand, Hand to Hand". With the aid of Sydney and Tanker (who were in the vehicles Jamb and Torb), Servo was able to knock him out this time with his main Grid Power Punch. Servo met him once more in "Hide and Servo" when Kilokhan chose him among Malcolm's drawings to see which Mega-Virus Monster will combat Servo after he is uncontrollably thrusted throughout cyberspace. After the battle, Plexton once again retreated (Plexton seemingly lost a portion of his tail while retreating).
 Chronic - a virus made from chromium alloy with a bladed left arm and a pincerlike right arm. On its chest was a red jewel that unleashed a barrier when attacked by beam weapons. First appearing in "Money For Nothin' and Bits for Free", Chronic tapped into the city's bank accounts making Malcolm rich. Servo then engages Chronic. After Tanker goes in and helps to get Servo unpinned from Chronic while destroying its red jewel, Servo destroyed it. In "Romeo and Joule-Watt", Malcolm revamps Chronic and sends him into the school's stage lights during the school's play of Romeo and Juliet. In "It's Magic", Chronic returned to disrupt Sam and Lucky London's magic show.
 Skorn (voiced by Neil Ross) is a ninja-style virus, deemed as perhaps the smartest of viruses, second-in-command to Kilokahn, and one of the only few who could actually speak. His combat skills were similar in technique to both a samurai and a ninja and were up to par with Servo's, and he wielded different weapons in battle, such as a sword, and a pair of nunchaku (which he also turned into a bo). Skorn also had the ability to create multiple clones of himself. Malcolm created him in "His Master's Voice" to send into the keyboard synthesizer to swap Sydney's voice with Tanker's voice. Sam transformed into Servo and fought Skorn. Tanker piloted Drago to help Servo. They formed Phormo and used its Lightning Grid Power to destroy Skorn. In "An Unhelping Hand", Malcolm revived Skorn and has Kilokhan send him into Sydney's wristwatch and controlled her hand. Skorn used this to hinder the attempts of Servo's friends to help him. Eventually, with Tanker holding back Sydney's hand and Amp typing in the computer for Sydney, they managed to send Servo his shield and sword programs to help him when Skorn clones himself. He was killed by Servo when Servo launched his sword/shield directly through Skorn. In "The President's a Frink", Malcolm uses him to fix the school presidential election. Here, he is destroyed again by Servo's shield/sword combo. In "Loose Lips Sink Microchips", Malcolm revives Skorn and sends him into Sam's school radio show at school to reveal embarrassing secrets about people. Here, he is again destroyed by Phormo.
 Kord is a giant reptilian monster with a camera-style eye, blinding floodlights built into his back, two tails, and is covered in magnetic plates. Kord had the ability to shoot fireballs of up to 10,000 degrees Celsius (as measured by Sydney) and could also make his shell super-heated, making physical contact with him dangerous. He could also restrain his opponents, leaving them vulnerable to his fireball attacks. He was responsible for trapping Sam inside a video camera in "Lights, Camera, Action". Servo had the initiative early on but then got burned when touching Kord's high-temperature eye/camera. Kord proceeded to have Servo shackled where he was burned by Kord's fireballs. Eventually, with the help of Xenon, who smashed the virus's camera eye, Servo was able to defeat Kord with his Grid Power slicer, which he launched at the virus, slicing him up before turning orange and disintegrating. In "Little Ditch, Big Glitch", Kord was later given some upgrades by Malcolm. This time, he had new black armor, no camera-style eye, and also had the ability to suck out Servo's main power. Servo was able to defeat him again with the Grid Power Punch after being aided in battle by Xenon. In "Give 'Til It Megahertz", Malcolm resurrects the Kord virus in its upgraded form and uses him to turn the people of Earth into a bunch of overly generous people including Team Samurai. In "Lucky's Unlucky Adventure", Kord is sent into Mrs. Starkey's cash register to make sure that the money comes up short enough to frame Lucky for the missing money. With help from Xenon, Servo destroys Kord with his Grid Power slicer.
 Gramm is a dinosauric ice virus and the sister of Plexton. She was sent into Sam's air conditioner in "The Cold Shoulder" causing Sydney, Tanker and Amp to turn cold and against one another. She was destroyed when Servo thrust his sword through the gem on her chest, just moments after Servo wiped out Plexton in the fight. She later teamed up once again with her brother against Servo, but was again tricked into attacking each other, causing the two of them to fight. Servo then took this opportunity to destroy them with his sword. In "Rock 'n' Roll Virucide", Servo fought Plexton and Gramm again. Servo defeats them with the same tactic.
 Sucker Virus is a dinosauric virus with a large mouth (with coils built into it). In "Amp Loves You, Yeah, Yeah, Yeah!", the Sucker Virus was sent to suck in all the power from every nuclear power plant. In battle, he tried to suck Servo inside of him until Sydney rushed in with Borr and bailed him out. However, Sydney took some damage, but Tanker and Amp turned the tide by coming in on Tracto and Vitor, respectively. They all merged with Servo to create Synchro, who then proceeded to wipe out the virus with a Grid Power Punch.
 Skeleton Virus is a Ceratopsian-headed dinosauric Mega-Virus monster. It had an armor that made him resemble a skeleton and he had something of a loud howl. While this virus was introduced in "Lights, Camera, Action", he had no formal introduction as the team fought him at the beginning of the episode. Plus, that battle was mirror-imaged. First appearing in "Amp Loves You, Yeah, Yeah, Yeah!", Kilokahn sent him to damage all the communication networks. The damage was shorting machinery circuits everywhere, jamming TV signals, and created an earthquake in the high school. Sam went into the digital realm as Servo to take this menace on. Servo had his way early on, but was sent reeling by fireballs that the virus shot from his mouth. Sydney sent Servo his Battle Shield to protect him from the fiery projectiles. The virus had another trick up his sleeve - he also had arrows built right into his armor, which he then proceeded to shoot right at Servo. Then, following another fireball attack, Servo's damage levels overloaded to the point that he was sent out of SyberSpace and the next second, Sam was back in his basement again. This time, Sam and Sydney, as well as Tanker and Amp, all went in to confront the virus again, and using Tracto, Borr and Vitor, they quickly merged with Servo to make the Synchro program. Synchro gave the virus a good thrashing, and neither the virus's fireballs nor arrows could faze Synchro. Synchro then used his Shoulder Drill Missile attack on the virus, and afterwards (in a move similar to the finisher that Phormo executed on Blink) finished off this virus by using the Grid Power Fire Stream from the gem on his chest. Servo later encountered this virus in the episode "Forget You!" where he was the cause of widespread amnesia in the real world and again came out the victor by using his Synchro powers.
 Unnamed Virus #1 - this draconic virus was sent into the fortune-telling game in "Que Sera Servo" that would turn everyone into the opposite of what their future would be. While fighting a cowardly Servo (as a result of Sam becoming a coward because of the spell), he used a spell that turned Servo evil. When Xenon came in to attack the virus, he had the upper hand until Kilokahn intervened using his powers to throw Team Samurai back out of cyberspace. Amp (who had become a genius because of the effects of the virus) took one of Sydney's chains and smashed the game, with the shock caused in Syberspace rocking Servo and turning him good once again, turning the tide of the battle back in his favor. He then used a powerful Grid Power kick on the virus, which caused him to actually go right through, and ultimately destroy, the virus.
 Hock - one of the deadliest viruses drawn by Malcolm and brought to life by Kilokhan. This green aardvark/dinosauric virus had tough armor and was armed with a pair of sword gauntlets on both arms. First appearing in "A Break in the Food Chain", Malcolm and Kilokhan sent him into the food factories for the purpose of stopping shipments of food to the world that needs it. In battle, he was actually able to block Servo's Grid Power punch, but as the battle was turned back in Servo's favor (after Servo was able to strike him with his sword/Grid Power combination), the virus retreated. Servo took him on again in "Sweet and Sour Kilokahn" at the time when Sydney used a program that made Kilokahn good causing him to not bring Hock to life for Malcolm. When that was eliminated from Kilokhan, Servo fought Hock and the virus again retreated. He later reappeared in "The Taunt Heard Round the World" with some upgraded armor and was redubbed "The Hockinator". He had a target system in one eye and threw powerful boomerangs at Servo that would knock out at least 12% of his power per hit. After Sydney sent him the Dragon Cannon, Servo used it to turn the tide of the battle back in his favor, and then soon afterwards, Hock was finally eliminated by Servo's Grid Power. The normal Hock did appear again in the episode "Truant False", inside the school's computer, but was destroyed by an anti-virus system that appeared similar to Manfu. In the episode "What Rad Universe!", Sam, who was in an alternate dimension, became Servo with the help of Malcolm (who in that dimension was a nice guy and a computer whiz) to fight against the Hockinator once again (who was brought to life by Yolanda Pratchert instead of Malcolm Frink), and defeated him again with the Grid Power.
 Sybo (voiced by Glen Beaudin in the first appearance) - when Kilokahn took over Malcolm's body in "Mal-Khan-Tent", he stuck Malcolm inside this orange dinosauric virus (who still had Malcolm's voice) with six long spikelike appendages. He tried to break out of Syberspace but he was stopped by Servo and was destroyed by his Grid Power. After that Malcolm was back in his old body again. Some episodes later Servo fought and defeated this virus again (but obviously without Malcolm attached to him). In "Just Brown & Servo", this virus was re-designed by Malcolm with some upgraded armor and a mace ball on both his tail and left hand. He was destroyed by the Grid Power of Synchro this time. In "Beep My, Beep My Baby", Sybo is sent into Jennifer's pager to give off a hypnotic beep to maker her love Malcolm and not Sam. When Sybo assumes its upgraded form, Synchro defeats him in the same manner.
 Troid - a blue Pterodactylus-style virus who had the ability to fly and attack from the air. Troid also had the ability to turn invisible while attacking, initially leaving Servo helpless to fight back until he summoned his computer's art program to help him, covering it in paint and leaving it visible. He first appeared inside Jennifer's Pom-Poms in "Ashes to Ashes, Disk to Disk", causing whoever held them to be trapped inside SyberSpace where they were stored on floppy disks. After a battle with Servo, he retreated. Servo fought him again at the beginning of "My Virus Ate My Homework", and it was very much the same battle. Only this time, Servo destroyed him with his Grid Power Punch.
 Unnamed Virus #2 - a robotic dinosauric virus used by Malcolm to knock out the world's electricity in "Hello Darkness, My Old Friend". After an argument with Malcolm about who created the Internet, Kilokhan went behind Malcolm's back and brought this virus to life in order to have the world's electricity flow to him. Malcolm did not like this plan when he found out about it. Because of the power outage, Amp had to operate the exercise bike to provide power so that Sam can become Servo and fight this virus. With help from Tanker and Drago, Servo was able to defeat this virus with the Grid Power Punch and restore power to the world. In "Portrait of the Artist as a Young Virus", Malcolm recreates this virus to alter the high school schedules so that he would be put in the same class as Jennifer. Like before, Servo and Drago defeated this virus. In "Pratchert's Radical Departure", this virus is sent into Principal Pratchert's bullhorn to regress him back to his hippie days.
 Sydney's Virus - as Kilokahn decided he no longer wanted Malcolm creating viruses for him in "Pride Goeth Before a Brawl", he decided to enlist the aid of another computer user with that person being Sydney. He was able to coerce her to make a virus, which looked like nothing more than a peach-colored, timid creature (with a head actually found on her abdomen) who was not exactly evil and had a voice similar to Sydney's. Servo went in to face her, but the confused virus was not in a fighting mood and apologized for the rampage. Later, Kilokahn showed Malcolm what Sydney created, and Malcolm made the virus truly evil this time (giving her an upgrade in the form of a black, rhinocerotiform face), and Servo would struggle against her this time. Sydney, feeling responsible, offered to pilot Drago in Tanker's place (to which Tanker agreed) and combined Drago with Servo to bring in Phormo. Towards the end of the battle the virus tried to apologize again, but to no avail. She was eliminated by Phormo's Lightning Grid Power Punch.
 Nightmare Virus - this stag beetle/dinosauric virus had a large shell, a mouth with several jagged teeth, and two long, powerful tentacles for arms. It briefly fought Servo in "An Un-helping Hand". Sydney and Tanker boarded Tracto and Borr to help Servo. In "To Sleep, Perchance to Scream", the Nightmare Virus was sent into Sam's digital clock to give him numerous nightmares. When the morning seemingly came, and Sam's friends were able to find out where the virus is, it was destroyed by Servo with his Grid Power Punch with help from Jamb & Torb. After that, Sam woke up and all seemed to be a dream.
 Rock n' Roll Virus (voiced by Jess Harnell) is a musical delinquent-themed dinosauric virus responsible for turning Mrs. Starkey into a heavy rock and roll maniac in "Rock n' Roll Virucide".
 Smog Virus - this tall, black dinosauric virus had two tails from which he could emit deadly red smog. After a new floppy drive ate Malcolm's disk and nearly ate his hand (causing him to only be able to type with one hand), he used this virus to get revenge on the people of Tokyo, where the floppy drive was presumably made in "Born with a Jealous Mind". The smog from the virus caused the residents of Tokyo to collapse everywhere in the streets. Sam told Tanker of this danger as he tried to convince Tanker to not be so jealous of the fact that Sydney was on a date with superstar Chad Williams. Sam then became Servo and went in to confront the virus. He had the upper-hand early on, but once the Smog Virus became too powerful for him - especially when he started using his smog against Servo - Tanker boarded Drago and went in to help his buddy. After he had Drago breathe fire at the virus, Tanker used Drago to merge with Servo and create the Phormo program. Phormo manhandled the virus and soon put him out with the Lightning Grid Power Punch. The Smog Virus was later seen in the episode "Do Not Reboot 'Til Christmas", where he was used to make all battery-powered toys explode at midnight on Christmas Eve. With the help of Phormo (piloted by Tanker), Servo was able to destroy him again, a split second before midnight.
 Stupid Virus (voiced by Neil Ross) - a black dinosauric Mega-Virus similar to Skeleton who tampered with the national test scores at high school in "Cheater, Cheater, Megabyte Eater". Its key power and weakness was its third eye, which was taken out by Servo after being pinned down by Xenon. Earlier in the battle, when Xenon fired its missile fists, the third eye was able to redirect the fists to hit Servo instead. In "Over the River and Through the Grid", the Stupid Virus was sent to cut Mrs. Starkey's utilities making her unable to attend the annual Thanksgiving motorcycle trip with her friends as it was instructed to immobilize any electronic device within a certain radius. Servo and Xenon defeated it with the same tactic.
 Manfu - a dark green hunchbacked Mega-Virus whose head is embedded in his abdomen, and on that head he had two horns from which he could emit blasts of electricity. This was one of Malcolm's deadliest viruses. Servo encountered him three different times. He first was sent into the school's water fountain in "Stiff as a Motherboard" and when Sam tried to drink from it, he became completely paralyzed, unable to move or speak. With the help of his friends, Sam was able to go into the computer and become Servo. In battle, Manfu trapped Servo (encasing him in computer chips from the waist down), and while Servo managed to hold back Manfu for some time with his shield and sword, it was not enough and it prompted the others to form Xenon to help Servo. However, Manfu proved to be too much for Xenon (first shooting off its arms and then finishing it off with a second blast, causing Sydney, Tanker and Amp to be thrust back out of Cyberspace and into the real world again). Servo then escaped by reflecting back the energy at him. He then broke off Manfu's horns, and then tossed him high in the air. While he was still spinning in the air, Servo eliminated him with his Grid Power Punch. In "Syberteria Combat", Manfu created a barrier around the school at night. The battle went similarly, though this time Manfu took out Xenon in one blast, but Servo emerged victorious again. In "Truant False", the school computer sent an anti-virus after Hock, which Malcolm used to try to alter his attendance records so he could skip summer school. After the anti-virus destroyed Hock, Malcolm decided to corrupt the anti-virus, modifying its look to make it look exactly like Manfu, and Servo went to battle it. Sydney reminded Servo that he could not destroy it since it was actually an anti-virus, and destroying it would crash the computer system. The anti-virus very nearly destroyed Servo, but Sydney was able to reprogram it just in time, turning it back into the anti-virus and making it good again.
 Nixtor is a Hercules Beetle/dinosauric Mega-Virus used by Malcolm in "Water You Doing?" to turn the city's water supply into hydrochloric acid. He was brown in color, crawled on four legs, and had two pincerlike horns sticking out of his head. When Servo first encountered him, Nixtor made the ground below Servo melt, causing him to fall one level to where Nixtor was actually hiding. He then had Servo locked up in chains and caused deadly gas to spray at Servo. The gang prepared to aid Servo, but Tanker could not go in the end due to being sick in his stomach. Sydney and Amp boarded Borr and Vitor to aid Servo in battle. They freed him and helped turn the tide of the battle back in his favor. In the end Servo managed to win by wiping out the virus with his Grid Power Punch. This virus would be used again in "Tanks For the Memories" where he would be sent into Tanker's Walkman, completely messing with Tanker's personality by distracting him and making him say obscure quotes. The battle was the same as before, with Tanker's impairment keeping him from joining the battle this time.
 Raedon is a Mega-Virus that resembles an armor upgraded version of Troid. Its wings can emit deadly lasers or be used to fly. In "Starkey in Syberspace", Kilokahn and Malcolm realized that typically their monsters were stronger than Servo, but he managed to win because of the others providing back-up in their vehicles. Kilokahn created an Input/Output barrier so that the next time Servo went into Syberspace to battle Raedon, he would be cut off from the help of Team Samurai. However, Mrs. Starkey had accidentally transported herself into the digital world before the barrier was up when she mistook a picture of the Drago Jet on Sydney's laptop for a video game. Per Kilokahn's expectations, this virus proved to be super strong and almost had Servo beaten, but Mrs. Starkey (who was obviously unaware of Servo's origins or identity) helped Servo out against the monster. After getting fired at a few times by the Starkey-piloted Drago Jet, Raedon was finally eliminated by Servo's Grid Power Punch.
 Unnamed Virus #3 - this virus was not officially named on the show, but he very much resembled a non-armored version of Krono. This version of him had a light bulb-like structure on his head. Upon reluctantly agreeing to save Malcolm from Mrs. Starkey (who was under the love spell that came from the music box that the virus was placed into) in "Love Me Don't", Sam went in as Servo and made short work of the monster, tossing him about, breaking the light bulb on his head, and destroying him with his Grid Power. This was also the virus featured in "Take a Hike" where he was modified to knock out all the electricity in the world. As Sam was not present due to him being out of town, Tanker had to become Servo to take this virus on. He did and he manhandled the virus (Sydney remarked that Tanker fights viruses like he plays football) before destroying him with the Grid Power Punch.

Arsenal programs

Zenon program
 Zenon: A powerful humanoid created when the Vitor, Tracto, and Borr programs combine. Its fists can execute a ranged rocket punch, as in the battle against Kord, which it almost defeats on its own.
 Borr: An orange and black twin-drilled tank that can fly or burrow underground. Its driver is Sydney. Also, a famous basketball player - Charles "High Jump" Johnson - is dragged along to fight a Mega-Virus monster as a temporary driver for Borr when the band use the vehicles to escape the locked high school (in "Syber-Dunk"). Borr forms either Synchro's gauntlets and shoulder armor or Zenon's lower torso and upper legs.
 Tracto: A blue laser-equipped mini-tank. Its driver is Tanker. Tracto forms either Synchro's boots or Zenon's legs.
 Vitor: A red fighter jet armed with lasers, missiles, and a rig to restrain monsters. Its pilot is Amp and later Lucky. On one occasion it is piloted by Sydney, who has trouble flying it. Vitor forms either Synchro's helmet and body armor or Zenon's head, arms, and upper.

In an odd occurrence, Zenon fights Servo in "Que Sera Servo" when a Mega-Virus places Servo under a spell which has him obey solely Kilokahn, until Amp is able to break the virus' hold by using Syd's belt to reboot him.

When Borr, Tracto, and Vitor combine with Servo, they form Servo's upgrade known as Synchro, which is armed with a pair of shoulder drill missiles.

Drago program
 Drago: A wingless dragon assembled when Jamb and Torb combine. It is piloted by almost always Tanker and occasionally Sydney. Later in the series, Jamb and Torb would just appear as one single jet fighter that is piloted by either Sydney or Tanker and eventually just transforms into Drago. Neither Amp or Lucky pilot Drago during the series' run. While Tanker and Syd are the default pilots for the "Drago Jet", Mrs. Starkey did act as the pilot in "Starkey in Syberspace".
 Jamb: A dragon-head-shaped mini-jet which also is the bazooka-like flamethrower Dragon Cannon that is used by Servo. Its main pilot is Sydney.
 Torb: A jet with various weaponry. Its main pilot is Tanker.

When Drago combines with Servo, they form Servo's second upgrade known as Phormo, which is armed with a pair of laser gauntlets.

Production
Superhuman Samurai Syber-Squad was originally created by Tsuburaya Productions, Ultracom Inc. and DIC Productions, L.P. and was originally going to be named PowerBoy, but was renamed during production to avoid confusion with Saban Entertainment's American tokusatsu series Mighty Morphin Power Rangers. The series was made to capitalize on the upsurge in popularity of imported Japanese monster-robot shows which could be adapted with new, regionalized live-action footage. The series' development mirrored the creative construct established earlier with the Teenage Mutant Ninja Turtles. The master toy licensee, Playmates Toys, funded the series, interpolated American development via toy licensing rights, and did a commercial buy-in on the Fox network, where Haim Saban had established a kids block, with programs such as Mighty Morphin' Power Rangers and the 1992 X-Men cartoon. Playmates called upon the development team at DIC—which, coincidentally, was working with Pangea Corporation, which assisted in the development of DIC's New Kids on the Block and Playmates's earlier hit, Teenage Mutant Ninja Turtles. DIC, Pangea, and Playmates's marketing group created an ensemble of character names, traits and profiles, which were spun into a series offering. Under a product placement deal, Compaq computers were prominently featured in the series and were used to generate the show's computer-generated graphics.

Elements of this series are used in the anime series adaptation of Gridman the Hyper Agent, SSSS.Gridman. The "SSSS" abbreviation in the title references Superhuman Samurai Syber-Squad.

Episodes

Home media release
In 1995, Buena Vista Home Video (under the DIC Toon Time Video label) released the series on three two-episode VHS cassettes. In February 2013, Mill Creek Entertainment released the series' first DVD volume in Region 1 for the very first time. The three-disc set features the first 28 episodes of the series. On October 1 in that year, Mill Creek released the second DVD volume which features the remaining 25 episodes.

Online distribution
Five episodes (new episodes were added and old episodes were removed on Wednesdays) were available on Jaroo, which was an online video site then operated by Cookie Jar Entertainment with which DIC later merged. In or after 2013, Cookie Jar was taken over by DHX Media. The Jaroo site closed as a result, but DHX Media mentioned that it planned to re-locate the site, and its shows, for online distribution.

As of February 2016, the series could be streamed through the Pluto TV app on the "After School Cartoons" channel 370.

See also
 Gridman the Hyper Agent - the Japanese tokusatsu counterpart of origin of this series
 Mighty Morphin Power Rangers - a 90's series also adapted from a Japanese tokusatsu
 SSSS.Gridman - the anime series adaptation of Gridman the Hyper Agent
 SSSS.Dynazenon - the sequel to SSSS.Gridman

References

External links
 Superhuman Samurai Syber-Squad at DHX Media Ltd.
 

1990s American comic science fiction television series
1990s American high school television series
1994 American television series debuts
1995 American television series endings
Television series by DIC Entertainment
Television series by Fremantle (company)
Teen superhero television series
American Broadcasting Company original programming
American action television series
American adventure television series
American fantasy television series
American comic science fiction television series
American television series based on Japanese television series
English-language television shows
Cyberpunk television series
Martial arts television series
Playmates Toys
Tsuburaya Productions
Television shows about virtual reality
Ultra television series
Television series about teenagers
Japan in non-Japanese culture
Television series created by Jymn Magon